Mushroom spawn is a substrate that already has mycelium growing on it. 

Mycelium, or actively growing mushroom culture, is placed on growth substrate to seed or introduce mushrooms to grow on a substrate. This is also known as inoculation, spawning or adding spawn. Its main advantages are to reduce chances of contamination while giving mushrooms a firm beginning.

Mycelium, or actively growing mushroom culture, is placed on a substrate—usually sterilized grains such as rye or millet—and induced to grow into those grains. This is called inoculation. Inoculated grains (or plugs) are referred to as spawn. Spores are another inoculation option, but are less developed than established mycelium. Since they are also contaminated easily, they are only manipulated in laboratory conditions with a laminar flow cabinet.

See also 
 Fungiculture
 Spawn (biology)#Fungi

Notes 

Fungi in cultivation